Uppsala County is one of the 29 multi-member constituencies of the Riksdag, the national legislature of Sweden. The constituency was established in 1970 when the Riksdag changed from a bicameral legislature to a unicameral legislature. It is conterminous with the county of Uppsala. The constituency currently elects 12 of the 349 members of the Riksdag using the open party-list proportional representation electoral system. At the 2022 general election it had 292,255 registered electors.

Electoral system
Uppsala County currently elects 12 of the 349 members of the Riksdag using the open party-list proportional representation electoral system. Constituency seats are allocated using the modified Sainte-Laguë method. Only parties that that reach the 4% national threshold and parties that receive at least 12% of the vote in the constituency compete for constituency seats. Supplementary leveling seats may also be allocated at the constituency level to parties that reach the 4% national threshold.

Election results

Summary

(Excludes leveling seats)

Detailed

2020s

2022
Results of the 2022 general election held on 11 September 2022:

The following candidates were elected:
 Constituency seats - Catarina Deremar (C), 636 votes; Gustaf Lantz (S), 916 votes; Sanne Lennström (S), 1,301 votes; Lina Nordquist (L), 732 votes; Stefan Olsson (M), 689 votes; Mikael Oscarsson (KD), 1,306 votes; David Perez (SD), 157 votes; Jacob Risberg (MP), 648 votes; Jessika Roswall (M), 1,874 votes; Ardalan Shekarabi (S), 3,157 votes; Ilona Szatmári Waldau (V), 1,087 votes; and Lars Wistedt (SD), 36 votes.
 Leveling seats - Inga-Lill Sjöblom (S), 304 votes.

2010s

2018
Results of the 2018 general election held on 9 September 2018:

The following candidates were elected:
 Constituency seats - Paula Bieler (SD), 390 votes; Marlene Burwick (S), 1,466 votes; Pyry Niemi (S), 472 votes; Lina Nordquist (L), 1,023 votes; Marta Obminska (M), 1,582 votes; Mikael Oscarsson (KD), 1,486 votes; Jessika Roswall (M), 1,264 votes; Michael Rubbestad (SD), 65 votes; Ardalan Shekarabi (S), 3,104 votes; Ilona Szatmári Waldau (V), 1,255 votes; and Solveig Zander (C), 942 votes.
 Leveling seats - Maria Gardfjell (MP), 924 votes; and Sanne Lennström (S), 864 votes.

2014
Results of the 2014 general election held on 14 September 2014:

The following candidates were elected:
 Constituency seats - Per Bill (M), 1,016 votes; Josef Fransson (SD), 14 votes; Agneta Gille (S), 2,476 votes; Ulrika Karlsson (M), 2,182 votes; Niclas Malmberg (MP), 586 votes; Pyry Niemi (S), 643 votes; Ardalan Shekarabi (S), 2,936 votes; Jessika Vilhelmsson (M), 1,459 votes; Emma Wallrup (V), 1,060 votes; Maria Weimer (FP), 1,123 votes; and Solveig Zander (C), 1,024 votes.
 Leveling seats - Mikael Oscarsson (KD), 1,756 votes.

2010
Results of the 2010 general election held on 19 September 2010:

The following candidates were elected:
 Constituency seats - Per Bill (M), 1,463 votes; Agneta Gille (S), 1,435 votes; Ismail Kamil (FP), 760 votes; Ulrika Karlsson (M), 3,676 votes; Helena Leander (MP), 1,230 votes; Pyry Niemi (S), 596 votes; Marta Obminska (M), 477 votes; Mikael Oscarsson (KD), 2,009 votes; Thomas Östros (S), 5,218 votes; Jessika Vilhelmsson (M), 1,970 votes; and Solveig Zander (C), 1,344 votes.
 Leveling seats - Lars Isovaara (SD), 6 votes; and Jacob Johnson (V), 630 votes.

2000s

2006
Results of the 2006 general election held on 17 September 2006:

The following candidates were elected:
 Constituency seats - Mats Berglind (S), 391 votes; Per Bill (M), 2,252 votes; Agneta Gille (S), 834 votes; Lennart Hedquist (M), 1,254 votes; Ulrika Karlsson (M), 1,254 votes; Helena Leander (MP), 618 votes; Mikael Oscarsson (KD), 1,777 votes; Thomas Östros (S), 3,130 votes; Tone Tingsgård (S), 176 votes; Cecilia Wikström (FP), 2,013 votes; and Solveig Zander (C), 1,294 votes.
 Leveling seats - Jacob Johnson (V), 338 votes.

2002
Results of the 2002 general election held on 15 September 2002:

The following candidates were elected:
 Constituency seats - Mats Berglind (S), 593 votes; Per Bill (M), 1,930 votes; Ingrid Burman (V), 710 votes; Agneta Gille (S), 876 votes; Lennart Hedquist (M), 659 votes; Mikael Oscarsson (KD), 1,710 votes; Thomas Östros (S), 4,798 votes; Tone Tingsgård (S), 401 votes; Erik Ullenhag (FP), 2,137 votes; and Cecilia Wikström (FP), 1,657 votes.
 Leveling seats - Åsa Domeij (MP), 1,471 votes; and Rigmor Stenmark (C), 1,008 votes.

1990s

1998
Results of the 1998 general election held on 20 September 1998:

The following candidates were elected:
 Constituency seats - Barbro Andersson (S), 691 votes; Mats Berglind (S), 567 votes; Per Bill (M), 3,581 votes; Ingrid Burman (V), 1,269 votes; Birgitta Dahl (S), 5,945 votes; Lennart Hedquist (M), 1,076 votes; Harald Nordlund (FP), 1,178 votes; Mikael Oscarsson (KD), 1,509 votes; Thomas Östros (S), 2,121 votes; and Gustaf von Essen (M), 1,707 votes.
 Leveling seats - Rigmor Ahlstedt (C), 1,472 votes; and Gunnar Goude (MP), 537 votes.

1994
Results of the 1994 general election held on 18 September 1994:

1991
Results of the 1991 general election held on 15 September 1991:

1980s

1988
Results of the 1988 general election held on 18 September 1988:

1985
Results of the 1985 general election held on 15 September 1985:

1982
Results of the 1982 general election held on 19 September 1982:

1970s

1979
Results of the 1979 general election held on 16 September 1979:

1976
Results of the 1976 general election held on 19 September 1976:

1973
Results of the 1973 general election held on 16 September 1973:

1970
Results of the 1970 general election held on 20 September 1970:

References

Riksdag constituencies
Riksdag constituencies established in 1970
Riksdag constituency